The 1949 National League Division One was the 15th season of speedway in the United Kingdom and the fourth post-war season of the highest tier of motorcycle speedway in Great Britain.

Summary
Birmingham Brummies joined the league and the Anniversary (League) Cup was discontinued or the teams would have met each other six times in the league. Wembley Lions won the National League for the fourth time.

Final table

Top Ten Riders (League only)

National Trophy Stage Three
The 1949 National Trophy was the 12th edition of the Knockout Cup. The Trophy consisted of three stages; stage one was for the third division clubs, stage two was for the second division clubs and stage three was for the top tier clubs. The winner of stage one would qualify for stage two and the winner of stage two would qualify for the third and final stage. Belle Vue Aces won the third and final stage and were therefore declared the 1949 National Trophy champions.

 For Stage One - see Stage One
 For Stage Two - see Stage Two

First round

Second round

Semifinals

Final

First leg

Second leg

Belle Vue were National Trophy Champions, winning on aggregate 140–76.

See also
 List of United Kingdom Speedway League Champions
 Knockout Cup (speedway)

References

Speedway National League
National League
Speedway National League